Helon is a surname, the name of an ancient Scythian culture, a language, a Christian, geographical and botanical name of biblical, Hebrew and Greek origin.

Etymology
Pronounced /'hɛə'loɴ/ and phonetically spelt khay-lone', the name is derived from the Hebrew: He, Lamed, Nun Sofit.

Transliterated as: Chelon, Chêlôn, Khay-lone', האֵלן ,הלן, or האֵלנ in Hebrew; Gehlen, Gelen, Gelin, or Гелен in Russian; Gelon, or Гелон in Ukrainian; Gelon, or Γέλων in Greek; Helan in Czech; Helon in English and
Latin. Common spelling in the Polish language (since the 15th century) is Helon , but the name can also be rendered as Chelon; the 'C' being silent.

Spelling of the name Helon is often confused with and rendered Helen, Helin, or Elon.

The progenitor of the name was Helon, the second son of Zebulon ben (of) Jacob, Prince of the Tribe of Zebulon.

In keeping with the seafaring occupation and inherent traditions of the Tribe of Zebulon, the name Helon, its usages and derivatives are synonymous with traits indicative of water.

The earliest known written references to the name Helon as rendered in its current and correct Latin form are contained in various Latin Codexes, including the Codex Gigas (the Great Book, or Devil's Bible); the world's largest and most complete bible manuscript which predates the King James Bible by approximately 300 years and the Gutenberg Bible by approximately 150 years.

Since publication of the King James Bible of 1611, the name Helon as it appears in historical and contemporary bibles, concordances and biblical commentaries has been perpetually corrupted and rendered as Elon (phonetically spelt ay-lone).

Elon (sometimes Elom, as referenced in the Gutenberg Bible, or Helom) was the name of the Hittite father of Basemath (who was also called Adah), the second wife of Esau ben Isaac.

Dr James Strong (1890) who based his Exhaustive Concordance of the Bible on the King James (KJV) rendering, defined Elon (transliterated as ay-lone', ay-lone', ay-lone', or אֵילוֹן in Hebrew) as an oak-grove, terebinth, or mighty - derived from the Hebrew 'ayil, or איל; strength, an oak, strong tree, or anything strong - meanings which are inconsistent with the characteristic traits of the seafaring occupation of the Tribe of Zebulon which are indicative of water.

Elsewhere unknown as a Zebulonite name by definition, the misnomer Elon has continually been applied erroneously by subsequent biblical and theologian commentators and included as a matter of course into those bibles published post 1611; where in its place should be the correct rendering Helon.

According to McNair (2012):
During the time of the Hebrew Patriarchs, it was customary to always name an individual with an appellation commensurate with another person, event or feature of significance. There are hardly any examples in the Hebrew Scriptures of an individual receiving a name without some importance attached to it.

In his treatise The Wisdom of the Hebrew Alphabet, Rabbi Munk imparts the sacred Kabbalistic meanings of the letters of the Hebrew Aleph-Beis as embraced in the name הלן (Helon):

Said Rabbi Munk of the missing letter ה (He), the symbol of divinity, gentility and specificity:

One missing letter is a painful outcry for the lost glory of the First Temple!

According to the Talmudist Rabbi Louis Ginzberg (1873–1953):

Corresponding to the occupation of the tribe of Zebulun ("who shall settle at the shore of the sea; he shall be a haven for ships, and his border shall be at Sī'don", Gen 49:13) its prince was called Eliab, "the ship," son of Helon, "the sand," for this tribe spent its life on ships, seeking "treasures hidden in the sand."

In the Polish language, it means ‘żołw’, a turtle of the order Chelonians.

The British Methodist Theologian and Commentator Dr Adam Clark (circa 1760-1832) verbalized during his sermon "The Doctrine of Endless Misery not Taught in the Bible" that:

The word hell comes from the Anglo-Saxon helon, to cover or hide; hence the tiling or slating of a house is called, in some parts of England, heling, to this day; and the covers of books (in Lancashire) by the same name.

Cyrus Alvin Potts (1922) defined Helon:

Valde strenus – Very persevering, or brave; strong.

Past Worshipful Master and Masonic historian Harry Mendoza (1989) designated Helon to mean:
God is father. Strong.

George K. Barr (1990) citing Numbers 1:9 and 2:7 delineates Helon to mean:

Their army, fortress.

Helon in the Bible

The first century Romano-Jewish historian Josephus wrote:
‘Zabulon had with him three sons – Sarad, Helon, Jalel.’

Helon was the second son of Zebulon, ben (or son of) Jacob: Genesis 46:14 and Numbers 26:26. Also a Prince, and the father of Eliab who assisted Moses and Aaron in numbering the children of Israel in the wilderness of Sinai (circa 1461 B.C.): Numbers 1:9, 2:7, 7:24–29, 10:16.

Helon ben akhar ben (a direct descendant of) Zebulon judged Israel for 10 years (circa 1083–1073 B.C.) during the lawless period of Israel's history between the invasion of Canaan and the establishment of the monarchy: Judges 12:11–12.

Kettel (1847), Willson (1860), Willis (1867) and Davis (1903) have proposed that Helon was the name of the leper cleansed in Capernaum by Jesus as narrated by the Evangelists Matthew 8:1–4, Mark 1:40–45 and Luke 5:12–16.

Bradley (1908) wrote of a Rabbi Helon who was the procurer of the ass that Jesus rode during his triumphal entry into Jerusalem.

Genesis / Bereishith / בְּרֵאשִׁית ~ In the Beginning
Genesis 36:2 - Adah: The Wife of Esau

Genesis 46:14 - Helon: The Son of Zebulon (see also Numbers 26:26)

Numbers / Bamidbar / במדבר ~ In the Wilderness
Numbers 26:26 - Helon: The Son of Zebulon and progenitor of the Helonite Clan (see also Genesis 46:14)

Numbers 1:9 - Helon: The First Census in the Sinai Wilderness

Numbers 2:7 - Helon: The Camp Arrangement of the Tribes of Israel

Numbers 7:24 and 29 - Helon: Offerings of the Tribes of Israel

Numbers 10:16 - Helon: The Israelites Prepare to Break Camp

Judges / Shoftim / שׁוֹפְטִים ~ Judges
Judges 12:11–12 - Helon The Judge of Israel (circa 1083–1073 B.C.)

Noncanonical Biblical texts
In his book Helon's Pilgrimage to Jerusalem: A Picture of Judaism in the Century which Preceded the Advent of Our Saviour (1824), the German novelist and Judaic writer Gerhard 'Friedrich' Abraham Strauss (1786–1863) wrote:
Joppa is where the keeper of the genealogical register of the (Helon family) dwelt. but he was gone to Ziklag. Arriving in Ziklag the genealogist showed the pedigree of his family to Helon. Helon had been found to be of pure descent.

Kettel (1847) describes Helon as a Rabbi of high birth and a Member of the Sanhedrin who was present at the questioning of a man who calls himself Christ. Helon became a leper. He had a wife named Sarai (p. 251), a son Benaiah the younger (p. 349) and a daughter Miriam (pp. 353–354).

In an allegory penned in 1863, the author I.E.P. alludes to the leper Helon, then resident in a pleasant village in one of the western counties of England, as being a captive and wandering jew.

English novelist and Judaic writer Grace Aguilar wrote in her short composition Helon: A Fragment of Jewish History (1902) describing Helon as a Jewish minstrel living near the Rhine river at the start of Spring, close to the end of the eleventh century.

In Jesus of Nazareth: A Life (Bradley, 1908), Helon is described as:
A Rabbi and Zealot from Babylonia. He was a Scribe in his own country, one of the very few of his class who had anywhere joined the Zealots; and with all the trained subtlety and acumen of the accomplished lawyer that he was, he presented to Jesus the claims of the Zealots. Helon had procured an ass and foal, and had them at the turn of the road where Jerusalem in all its glory first comes in view; the ass that Jesus would ride on Palm Sunday.

In the chapter Mary and Helon, Helon is characterised as:
Artful and .. with little faith in Jesus, (Helon) would glady have discarded him altogether. Helon tried to manipulate Mary of Magdala to bribe Jesus to initiate a physical uprising.

Geographical associations

Helon is also the name of a Ukrainian beer brewed in Poltava by the PAT Firm Poltavpivo (ПАТ Фірма Полтавпиво). The Helon branded beer features, most significantly, a golden Scythian stag couchant which is consistent with the assertion of the American professor of history, political science, and Chair of Ukrainian Studies at the University of Toronto Paul Magocsi, et al. that Helons were Scythians:

The Scythians themselves also established fortified centers to coordinate their trade. [One of the] largest of these [was] Helon/Bil'sk.

Vasyl Yakovych Schevchuk, Doctor of Economic Sciences, Professor, President of the International Dnipro (Black Sea) Fund, and Minister of the Environment and Natural Resources of Ukraine (et al.) wrote in 2005 that:

On the territory of Belske, in an ancient town (Poltava Oblast), which was the location of the legendary capital of the forest-steppe Scythian Helon tribes depicted by Herodotus, some relics have been found - an antique ring made by an Ionian craftsman, as well Phoenician perfumes (sic) phials.

The Gelonians (or Geloni), also known as Helonians (or Heloni), whom could plausibly be the (Lat.) Helonitarum (Helonites) of Numbers 26:26, are mentioned as a nation in northwestern Scythia by Herodotus who stated that:

The Gelonians are actually Greek in their origins, descended from Hellenes who moved from their trading posts and settled among the Boudinoi. Their language is part Scythian, part Greek. There is a city among them called Gelonos (Her. IV, 108).

According to Schevchuk, et al.:

The lands along the Dnipro are saturated with the spirit of numerous civilisations that succeeded one another from the East as well as the West. Contemporary factual research will be of primary importance in determining the spiritual identity of the Indo-European cultural settlements, as well as the mysterious relationship between the Slavonic, Hindu, and Greek cultures. It will solve the riddle of the Scythian Hellenes, the mystery of the Helons of the Dnipro lands and their Dionysian cult, as well as other manifestations of Greek myths and rituals of unknown origin.

The timber-walled Scythian city of Helon is currently being reconstructed at (Більське городище) Belskoye (Belsk/Bil'sk), Kotelva district, Poltava, Ukraine (latitude 50° 05'N X longitude 34°38'E).

Helon is also the name of a town in Bhamo District, Momauk, Kachin State, Burma (latitude 24° 20' 0"N X longitude 97° 17' 0"E.) at altitude 102 metres (337 feet) above sea level.

Botany

In keeping with traits indicative of water, the name Helon has been used as the derivation of some botanical genera including the hardy perennial Helonias bullata Linnaeus (the swamp pink lily, or bog candle), of the family Liliaceae, and the perennial Heloniopsis Orientalis (the oriental swamp pink lily herb) of the family Liliaceae-Melanthiaceae.Helonias; from the Greek word helos, swamp, the natural habitat of the plant.Heloniopsis; from Helonias and Greek opsis, resemblance.

People with the name HelonSurname:George Helon (born 1965); Australian author, businessman and historian.Christian Name:'''
Helon Habila (born 1967); Nigerian novelist and poet.

 References 

Further reading
Aguilar, Grace. HELON: A Fragment from Jewish History. The Vale of Cedars and Other Tales. J.M. Dent & Co.: London, 1902; pp. 387–395.
Bradley, Samuel Carlyle. Jesus of Nazareth: A Life. Sherman, French & Company: Boston, 1908; pp. 293–295, 448–449, 452–453, 457, 466–467, 484–494, 513–514.
Gershevitch, Ilya, ed. The Scyths. The Cambridge History of Iran: Vol. 2. - The Median and Achaemenian Period. Cambridge University Press: Cambridge, 1993; pp. 149–199. .
Ginzberg, Louis. The Legends of the Jews. The Jewish Publication Society of America: Philadelphia, 1911. Volume Three: Moses in the Wilderness; p. 221.
Kettell, Thomas Prentice, ed. Letters from Jerusalem''. The United States Democratic Review. Pudney & Russell: New York, 1847; Vol. 20; pp. 154–160, 246–253, 348–354.
Mendoza, Harry. The Ensigns of the Twelve Tribes of Israel: The Royal Arch Banners. Lewis Masonic: Shepperton, UK, 1989; p. 71.
Potts, Cyrus Alvin. Dictionary of Bible Proper Names: Every Proper Name in the Old and New Testaments Arranged in Alphabetical Order; Syllabified and Accented; Vowel Sounds Diacritically Marked; Definitions Given in Latin and English. The Abingdon Press: New York, 1922; p. 110.
Schevchuk, Vasyl Yakovych et al. Preserving the Dnipro River: Harmony, History and Rehabilitation. Mosaic Press: Ontario, 2005; pp. 29, 34, 38, 48–49, 116.
Skinner, Otis Ainsworth. A Series of Sermons in Defence of the Doctrine of Universal Salvation. Sermon V: The Doctrine of Endless Misery not Taught in the Bible. Abel Tompkins: Boston, 1842; pp. 84–107.
Strassler, Robert B. The Landmark Herodotus: The Histories. Pantheon Books: New York, 2007; pp. 323–336.
Strauss, Friedrich. Helon's Pilgrimage to Jerusalem. A Picture of Judaism in the Century which Preceded the Advent of Our Saviour. J. Mawman: London, 1824.
Strauss, Friedrich. Helon's Pilgrimage to Jerusalem: A Picture of Judaism, in the Century which preceded the Advent of Our Saviour. Wells and Lilly: Boston, 1825.
Strauss, Friedrich. The Glory of the House of Israel; or the Hebrew's Pilgrimage to the Holy City: Comprising a Picture of Judaism in the Century which preceded the Advent of Our Saviour. J.P. Lippincott & Co: Philadelphia, 1859.
Whiston, William (trans). Josephus: The Complete Works. Thomas Nelson Publishers: Nashville, USA, 1998; Book 1: 18, 5 (p. 53); Book 2: 7, 4 (p. 75); Book 5: 7, 14 (p. 172).
Willis, Nathaniel Parker. The Poetical Works of N.P. Willis. George Routledge and Co.: London, 1867; pp. 5–9.

External links 

Audio of the Hebrew pronunciation of the name Elon.
Audio of the Hebrew pronunciation of the name Helon.
Codex Gigas (the Great Book, or Devil's Bible): original Folios.
Helon's Pilgrimage to Jerusalem: A Picture of Judaism, in the Century which Preceded the Advent of Our Saviour. Volumes 1–2; 1825 (English language edition).

Book of Genesis people
Given names originating from a surname
Hebrew-language given names
Hebrew-language surnames
Jewish given names
Jewish surnames
Surnames
Tribes described primarily by Herodotus